Ewa Damek (born 9 August 1958) is a Polish mathematician at the University of Wrocław whose research interests include harmonic analysis, branching processes, and Siegel domains.

Education and career
Damek is a professor in the mathematical institute of the University of Wrocław, which she directed from 2002 to 2007.

After a stint at the University of Georgia in the US, she returned to Wrocław, where she became a full professor in 2000.

Contributions
In 1992, with Fulvio Ricci, Damek published a family of counterexamples to a form of the Lichnerowicz conjecture according to which harmonic Riemannian manifolds must be locally symmetric. The asymmetric spaces they found as counterexamples are at least seven-dimensional; they are called Damek–Ricci spaces.

Damek is the coauthor, with D. Buraczewski and T. Mikosch, of the book Stochastic Models with Power Law Tails: The Equation  (Springer, 2016).

Recognition
In 2011 Damek was named a knight of the Order of Polonia Restituta.

References

1958 births
Living people
Polish mathematicians
Polish women mathematicians
University of Wrocław alumni
University of Georgia alumni
Academic staff of the University of Wrocław
Knights of the Order of Polonia Restituta